The 2019 NCAA Rifle Championships took place from March 8 to March 9 in Morgantown, West Virginia, at the WVU Coliseum. The tournament went into its 40th consecutive NCAA Rifle Championships, and featured eight teams across all divisions.

Team results

 Note: Top 8 only
 (H): Team from hosting U.S. state

Individual results

 Note: Table does not include consolation
 (H): Individual from hosting U.S. State

References

2019 in American sports
2019 in sports in West Virginia
NCAA Rifle Championship
NCAA